The 2000 Stanley Cup playoffs, was the playoff tournament of the National Hockey League (NHL), that began on April 12, 2000, and concluded on June 10. The New Jersey Devils defeated the reigning champion Dallas Stars in a six-game series to win their second Stanley Cup title in franchise history.

Sixteen teams qualified for the playoffs, eight from each conference, played best-of-seven series in each round, ending with each conference's champion playing a best-of-seven series in the Stanley Cup Finals for the Stanley Cup.

The Calgary Flames and the Vancouver Canucks both missed the playoffs this year. This would not happen again until 2014, when all four Western Canadian teams missed the playoffs. For the first time in history, only two Original Six teams made it to the playoffs (Toronto and Detroit). This would only happen again in 2001 (Toronto and Detroit), 2007 (New York Rangers and Detroit), 2018 (Boston and Toronto), and 2019 (Boston and Toronto). Also for the first time, the Boston Bruins and the Montreal Canadiens missed the playoffs in the same season. In addition, both conference finals went to the maximum seven games. This did not happen again until 2015.

Playoff seeds

The following teams qualified for the playoffs:

Eastern Conference
 Philadelphia Flyers, Atlantic Division champions, Eastern Conference regular season champions – 105 points
 Washington Capitals, Southeast Division champions – 102 points
 Toronto Maple Leafs, Northeast Division champions – 100 points
 New Jersey Devils – 103 points
 Florida Panthers – 98 points
 Ottawa Senators – 95 points
 Pittsburgh Penguins – 88 points
 Buffalo Sabres – 85 points

Western Conference
 St. Louis Blues, Central Division champions, Western Conference regular season champions, Presidents' Trophy winners – 114 points
 Dallas Stars, Pacific Division champions – 102 points
 Colorado Avalanche, Northwest Division champions – 96 points
 Detroit Red Wings – 108 points
 Los Angeles Kings – 94 points
 Phoenix Coyotes – 90 points
 Edmonton Oilers – 88 points
 San Jose Sharks – 87 points

Playoff bracket

Conference Quarterfinals

Eastern Conference Quarterfinals

(1) Philadelphia Flyers vs. (8) Buffalo Sabres
This was the sixth playoff meeting between these two teams; with Philadelphia winning four of the five previous series. They last met in the 1998 Eastern Conference Quarterfinals, which Buffalo won in five games. Philadelphia won three of the four games in this year's regular season series.

(2) Washington Capitals vs. (7) Pittsburgh Penguins
This was the sixth playoff meeting between these two teams; with Pittsburgh winning four of the five previous series. They last met in the 1996 Eastern Conference Quarterfinals, which Pittsburgh won in six games. Pittsburgh won three of the four games in this year's regular season series.

(3) Toronto Maple Leafs vs. (6) Ottawa Senators
This was the first playoff meeting between these two teams. Ottawa won three of the four games in this year's regular season series. Ottawa won this year's five-game regular season series earning seven of ten points.

(4) New Jersey Devils vs. (5) Florida Panthers
This was the first playoff meeting between these two teams. New Jersey won three of the four games in this year's regular season series.

Western Conference Quarterfinals

(1) St. Louis Blues vs. (8) San Jose Sharks
This was the first playoff meeting between these two teams. St. Louis won this year's five-game regular season series earning nine of ten points.

(2) Dallas Stars vs. (7) Edmonton Oilers
This was the fourth consecutive and sixth overall playoff match-up between these two teams; with Dallas winning three of the five previous series. Dallas won last year's Western Conference Quarterfinals in a four-game sweep. Dallas won this year's four-game regular season series earning seven of eight points.

(3) Colorado Avalanche vs. (6) Phoenix Coyotes
This was the first playoff meeting between these two teams. These teams split their four-game regular season series.

(4) Detroit Red Wings vs. (5) Los Angeles Kings
This was the first playoff meeting between these two teams. These teams split their five-game regular season series.

Conference Semifinals

Eastern Conference Semifinals

(1) Philadelphia Flyers vs. (7) Pittsburgh Penguins

This was the third playoff meeting between these two teams; with Philadelphia winning both previous series. They last met in the 1997 Eastern Conference Quarterfinals, which Philadelphia won in five games. Philadelphia won this year's five-game regular season series earning nine of ten points.

Game four was the third-longest game in playoff history, as well as the longest since the NHL expanded in 1967.

(3) Toronto Maple Leafs vs. (4) New Jersey Devils 

This was the first playoff meeting between these two teams. Toronto won this year's four-game regular season series earning seven of eight points.

Martin Brodeur set a Stanley Cup playoff record in game six for the least shots against required (6) to record a shutout in a single game.

Western Conference Semifinals

(2) Dallas Stars vs. (8) San Jose Sharks
This was the second playoff meeting between these two teams; with Dallas winning the only previous series. Their only previous meeting was in the 1998 Western Conference Quarterfinals, which Dallas won in six games. San Jose won four of the six games in this year's regular season series.

(3) Colorado Avalanche vs. (4) Detroit Red Wings
This was the second consecutive playoff meeting and fourth overall playoff match-up between these two teams; with Colorado winning two of the three previous series. Colorado won last year's Western Conference Semifinals in six games. Detroit won four of the five games in this year's regular season series.

Conference Finals

Eastern Conference Final

(1) Philadelphia Flyers vs. (4) New Jersey Devils

This was the third playoff meeting between these two teams; with the teams splitting the two previous series. They last met in the 1995 Eastern Conference Finals, which New Jersey won in six games. This was Philadelphia's sixth appearance in the Conference Finals; they last made it to the Conference Finals in 1997 where they defeated the New York Rangers in five games. This was New Jersey's fourth appearance in the Conference Finals; they last made it to the Conference Finals in 1995. New Jersey won four of the five games during this year's regular season series.

The Devils overcame a 3–1 deficit to defeat the Flyers in seven games. In game seven Devils' forward Patrik Elias scored the series-winner at 17:28 of the third period. Eric Lindros suffered a concussion after getting hit by Scott Stevens in the first period of game seven and did not return; as a result of the hit this was the last game he played as a Flyer.

Western Conference Final

(2) Dallas Stars vs. (3) Colorado Avalanche
This was the second consecutive playoff meeting and second postseason match-up between these two teams. This was a rematch of last year's Western Conference Final, which Dallas won in seven games. Dallas made their third consecutive and fifth overall appearance in the Conference Finals; while Colorado made their second consecutive and sixth overall appearance in the Conference Finals. Colorado won this year's five-game regular season series earning seven of ten points.

Stanley Cup Finals

This was the first playoff meeting between these two teams. Dallas made their second consecutive and fourth overall appearance in the Finals, after defeating the Buffalo Sabres in six games the year before. New Jersey made their second Finals appearance and first since defeating the Detroit Red Wings in four games in 1995. Dallas won both games in this year's regular season series.

Playoff statistics

Skaters
These are the top ten skaters based on points.

Goaltenders
This is a combined table of the top five goaltenders based on goals against average and the top five goaltenders based on save percentage, with at least 420 minutes played. The table is sorted by GAA, and the criteria for inclusion are bolded.

See also
List of Stanley Cup champions
1999 NHL Entry Draft
50th National Hockey League All-Star Game
National Hockey League All-Star Game
NHL All-Rookie Team
1999 in sports
2000 in sports
1999–2000 NHL season
List of NHL seasons

References

External links
http://nhl.com/

playoffs
Stanley Cup playoffs